Cannonball Run may refer to:

Races

Automobile 

Cannonball Run Challenge, an unsanctioned speed record drive from New York to Los Angeles
Erwin "Cannon Ball" Baker's 1933 drive from New York City to Los Angeles
Cannonball Baker Sea-To-Shining-Sea Memorial Trophy Dash, an outlaw car race run several times in the 1970s, memorializing Erwin Baker's drive
 Australian Cannonball Cup, a street race from Melbourne to Perth held in 1984
 Northern Territory Cannonball Run, a competitive motorsport event staged on public roads in 1994 in Australia

Other 

 Cannonball run (Galle Face), an annual run in Colombo, Sri Lanka, to commemorate the 1845 misfiring of a British cannon on Galle Face Green

Film and television 

 Cannonball!, a 1976 film 
 The Cannonball Run, a 1981 film
 Cannonball Run II, a 1984 film
 Speed Zone, a 1989 film, also known as Cannonball Fever or Cannonball Run III
 Cannonball Run 2001, a reality television series

Other uses 

 Cannonball Run (roller coaster), a wooden roller coaster located at Waterville USA.

See also

 Cannonball (disambiguation)